Wari is a Thana of Dhaka District in the Division of Dhaka, Bangladesh. It is one of the oldest part of Dhaka city and also one of the most happening part of the Old Dhaka. This was the first planned residential area of Dhaka. This area was named after Frederic Wyre, who was a district collector. He contributed a lot for the development of this area.  

Location On Google Maps

References

Old Dhaka
Thanas of Dhaka